The 1992–93 Toronto Maple Leafs season was Toronto's 76th season in the National Hockey League (NHL).

Off-season

NHL draft

Regular season
 Grant Fuhr was traded by the Maple Leafs (with conditional pick in 1995 draft) to Buffalo Sabres for LW Dave Andreychuk, G Daren Puppa and first-round draft pick in the 1993 draft (D Kenny Jonsson) on February 2, 1993.

The 1992–93 season was a triumph for the Maple Leafs. It saw them set franchise records in wins (44) and points (99). Twenty-one-year-old goaltender Felix Potvin played his first full season with the team and was solid with a 25–15–7 record, a 2.50 goals against average (GAA), two shutouts and a .910 save percentage. In a season that saw 20 of 24 teams average more than three goals scored per game, the Maple Leafs goaltending was one of the best in the NHL, allowing only 241 goals in 84 games (only the Chicago Blackhawks allowed fewer goals than Toronto). The Maple Leafs also had a strong defence corps, anchored by Dave Ellett, Todd Gill, Sylvain Lefebvre, Jamie Macoun, Dmitri Mironov and Bob Rouse. Out of all 24 teams, the Maple Leafs allowed the fewest power-play goals in the regular season (69). Newcomers Dave Andreychuk and Daren Puppa also played very well. In just 31 games with the Leafs, Andreychuk scored 25 goals and had 13 assists for 38 points. Puppa won six out of eight games, had a 2.25 GAA, two shutouts and a .922 save percentage. Rookie Nikolai Borschevsky led the team in goals with 34 and would score a very important goal in the first round of the playoffs against the Detroit Red Wings; Borschevsky deflected Bob Rouse's shot 2:35 into the first overtime period of Game 7 at Joe Louis Arena to give the Leafs a 4–3 win and a four-games-to-three series win.

Doug Gilmour
Doug Gilmour had a career year in 1992–93. He had a franchise-record 127 points during the 1992–93 regular season and ranked eighth in NHL scoring. In the playoffs, he played a key role as the Leafs took out the powerhouse Detroit Red Wings and St. Louis Blues, both in seven games. Gilmour finished the playoffs with 35 points, behind only Wayne Gretzky. Gilmour was the runner-up for the Hart Memorial Trophy as regular season MVP and won the Frank J. Selke Trophy as best defensive forward, the first major NHL award that a Leaf player had won since 1967.

One of Gilmour's most memorable goals was scored during the 1993 second round playoffs series against the St. Louis Blues, in the second sudden death overtime period. Many fans remember him skating back and forth behind the St. Louis net multiple times before finally sliding the puck behind a sprawling Curtis Joseph. The Maple Leafs would go on to win the series, but would eventually be eliminated in the next round by Wayne Gretzky and the Los Angeles Kings. Toronto was leading the Conference series against Los Angeles 3–2 and many fans were hoping for an all-Canadian final as the Montreal Canadiens already advanced. However, during overtime of Game 6, Gretzky high-sticked Gilmour, drawing blood, without being assessed a penalty by the referee, Kerry Fraser, and then scored the winning goal moments later to stave off elimination. During game seven back at Maple Leaf Gardens, the Leafs were trailing 5–3 after Gretzky completed his hat-trick. The Maple Leafs scored one goal but couldn't find the equalizer, which sent the Kings to the finals.

Season standings

Schedule and results

October

1 Played at Copps Coliseum in Hamilton, Ontario.

November

1 Played at Copps Coliseum in Hamilton, Ontario.

December

January

February

March

April

Playoffs

Norris Division Semifinals: Detroit vs. Toronto 
In a revival of the heated Original Six rivalry, Nikolai Borschevsky's Game 7 overtime goal gave Toronto the series. This was also Toronto's first playoff win over Detroit since the Leafs beat the Wings in the full seven games back in the 1964 Stanley Cup finals.
 April 19 - Toronto 3 Detroit 6
 April 21 - Toronto 2 Detroit 6
 April 23 - Detroit 2 Toronto 4
 April 25 - Detroit 2 Toronto 3
 April 27 - Toronto 5 Detroit 4 (OT)
 April 29 - Detroit 7 Toronto 3
 May 1 - Toronto 4 Detroit 3 (OT)

Toronto wins best-of-seven series 4–3

Norris Division Final: Toronto vs. St. Louis
The Maple Leafs defeated the Blues in seven games to win the Norris Division playoffs, despite Blues' goaltender Curtis Joseph's efforts. The Blues were heavily outshot throughout the series including more than 60 shots in game one alone. Game 7 was the first to be played at Maple Leaf Gardens since the 1964 Finals when Andy Bathgate scored the cup clinching goal.
 May 3 - St. Louis 1 Toronto 2 (2OT)
 May 5 - St. Louis 2 Toronto 1 (2OT)
 May 7 - Toronto 3 St. Louis 4
 May 9 - Toronto 4 St. Louis 1
 May 11 - St. Louis 1 Toronto 5
 May 13 - Toronto 1 St. Louis 2
 May 15 - St. Louis 0 Toronto 6

Toronto wins best-of-seven series 4–3

Conference Finals: Toronto vs. Los Angeles
This exciting and very heated seven-game series has long been remembered by hockey fans. The Toronto Maple Leafs iced a highly competitive team for the first time in years and were hoping to break their 26-year Stanley Cup drought; they had not even been to the Final since their last Cup win in 1967. The Los Angeles Kings, led by captain Wayne Gretzky, also had high ambitions. During Game 1 (a dominating victory for the Leafs) Los Angeles blue-liner Marty McSorley delivered a serious open ice hit on Toronto's Doug Gilmour. Leafs captain Wendel Clark took exception to the hit and went after McSorley for striking their star player. Toronto coach Pat Burns tried scaling the bench to get at Los Angeles coach Barry Melrose because he thought he ordered the hit on Gilmour (McSorley later remarked in interviews that he received dozens of death threat messages on his hotel phone from angry fans). Toronto would take a 3–2 series lead after five games. Game 6 went back west to the Great Western Forum in Los Angeles; it too was not without controversy and was also decided on an overtime goal. During the 1992–93 season, there was a league-wide crackdown on High-Sticking infractions, whether they were accidental or not. In Game 6, Gilmour was part of controversy once again.  With the game tied at 4 in overtime, Wayne Gretzky clipped him in the face with the blade of his stick, drawing blood. Everyone thought that referee Kerry Fraser should have called a penalty on the play, but Gretzky was not penalized, and he went on to score the overtime goal moments later, evening the series at 3–3. He would score three goals in the deciding game to give Los Angeles a berth in the Stanley Cup Final for the first time in franchise history and also the first time the Kings win a playoff series against an Original Six team. Gretzky has been quoted as saying that his performance in Game 7 was the best NHL game of his career. 
 May 17 - Los Angeles 1 Toronto 4
 May 19 - Los Angeles 3 Toronto 2
 May 21 - Toronto 2 Los Angeles 4
 May 23 - Toronto 4 Los Angeles 2
 May 25 - Los Angeles 2 Toronto 3 (OT)
 May 27 - Toronto 4 Los Angeles 5 (OT)
 May 29 - Los Angeles 5 Toronto 4

Los Angeles wins best-of-seven series 4–3.

Player statistics

Regular season
Scoring

Goaltending

Playoffs
Scoring

Goaltending

Transactions
The Maple Leafs have been involved in the following transactions during the 1992-93 season.

Trades

Waivers

Expansion Draft

Free agents

Awards and records
 Pat Burns, Jack Adams Award.
 Doug Gilmour, Selke Trophy.
 Doug Gilmour, Molson Cup (most game star selections for Toronto Maple Leafs).
 Doug Gilmour, franchise record, most points in one season, 127 points.
 Doug Gilmour, franchise record, most points by a centre in one season, 127 points.
 Doug Gilmour, franchise record, most assists in one season, 95 assists.
 Doug Gilmour, most assists in one game (6), Toronto club record.

Farm Teams
 The Maple Leafs' farm team was the St. John's Maple Leafs in St. John's, Newfoundland.

References

Notes

Bibliography
 National Hockey League Official Guide and Record Book 2006, senior managing editor: Ralph Dinger, published in Canada by Dan Diamond & Associates, Toronto, Ontario, .

External links
 Maple Leafs on Hockey Database

Toronto Maple Leafs seasons
Toronto Maple Leafs season, 1992-93
Toronto